Born to Be a Star may refer to:

 Born to Be a Star (TV series), a singing talent-reality competition
 Born to Be a Star (album), a 2004 album by Jolin Tsai
 Bucky Larson: Born to Be a Star, a 2011 American comedy film